The Kinlay Group was a travel, tourism, and hospitality company. It operated in Ireland and the United Kingdom. The company went out of business in 2020 and a petition for liquidation was made on 27 March 2020.

History
The Kinlay Group was founded on 30 October 1972 as Usit Limited. From 13 October 1972 to 17 November 1989 the company was renamed Usit Ireland Limited. Since 17 November 1989 it has been registered as Kinlay Group Limited. The company is headquartered at 19-21 Aston Quay in Dublin. The company was bought out of examinership in 2002 by Neil O’Leary, Michael Tunney, and David Andrews. O'Leary sold his part of the company to Tunney and Andrews in 2019.

The group operated the following brands: including:
 Darkey Kelly
 Eurotrain
 Harding Hotel
 Irish Studies Summer School
 Kinlay House
 Kinlay House - the Five Star Hostel
 Maynooth Travel
 The Real Experience Group
 The Travel Company
 Travel Options
 Trinity College Summer School
 Trinity Summer School
 Usit
 Usit Accommodation Centres
 Usit Now
 Usit Student Travel
 Utravel
 Waterford Travel

The Usit group was composed of: Dublin Usit Ireland Limited, the principal trading company; School and Group Tours Limited; and Dublin College of Business Studies Limited.

In March 2020 provisional liquidators were appointed to four companies in the USIT travel group after the COVID-19 crisis caused their collapse.

In April 2020 the High Court confirmed the appointment of liquidators to companies in the USIT travel group.

References

Travel agencies
Transport companies established in 1972
Irish companies established in 1972
Travel and holiday companies of Ireland